Tavileh Chaman (also Romanized as Ţavīleh Chaman) is a village in Mashiz Rural District, in the Central District of Bardsir County, Kerman Province, Iran. At the 2006 census, its population was 73, in 12 families.

References 

Populated places in Bardsir County